America's Cup Management was private company formed to oversee the organisation of the 2007 America's Cup, including date, location, media rights, boat design, entry fees and all the key details required to conduct the America's Cup. It was formed by the Alinghi team principal, Ernesto Bertarelli. Alinghi as holders of the America's Cup following their win in the 2003 America's Cup, held the responsibility and benefits of defining the rules and structure for the next event, but much of the work was done in consultation with the Challenger of Record -- the Golden Gate Yacht Club and its representative BMW Oracle Racing.

America's Cup Management announced on July 5, 2007 that they anticipated a revenue surplus of approximately 30 million euros would be available for distribution to the 11 participating teams to provide the teams some financial continuity and encouragement to plan their participate in the 33rd America's Cup.  Under the term of the protocol issued by America's Cup Management for the 2007 event, 50% of the net surplus revenues are retained by the Defender (i.e. Alinghi) and the other 50% are distributed on the same basis as for the previous three editions of the America's Cup.  Of the remaining 50% then 40% is divided equally amongst all Challengers, 30% is divided equally amongst all Challenger semi-finalists in the Challenger Selection, 20% divided equally amongst both Challenger finalists in the Challenger Selection and 10% to the winner of the Challenger Selection.

In summary, Alinghi received 30 million euros and the remaining 30 million euros was distributed to the challengers as follows:

 Emirates Team New Zealand 2007 America's Cup Challenger - € 9,341,000
 Luna Rossa Challenge (beaten finalist) - € 6,341,000
 BMW Oracle Racing and Desafío Español 2007 (beaten semi-finalists) - € 3,341,000 each
 +39 Challenge, Areva Challenge, China Team, Mascalzone Latino-Capitalia Team, Team Shosholoza, United Internet Team Germany and Victory Challenge - € 1,091,000 each.

America's Cup